Lê Thanh Đạo (born 1944) was a MiG-21 pilot of the Vietnamese People's Air Force, he flew with the 921st and 927th fighter regiment and tied for fourth place amongst Vietnam War fighter aces with six kills.

The following victories include the kills that are known to be credited to him by the VPAF:
 18 December 1971, a USAF F-4D (serial number 06-241, 555th Tactical Fighter Wing, pilot Johnson, WSO Vaughan, POWs);
 10 May 1972, a USN F-4J (pilot Blackburn (MIA-KIA), RIO Rudloff (POW), US claims AAA);
 12 June 1972, an F-4 Phantom (US does not confirm);
 24 July 1972, an F-4 Phantom (US does not confirm);
 24 July 1972, Firebee (shared);
 09 September 1972, an F-4 Phantom (US does not confirm);
 11 September 1972, a USAF F-4E (pilot Ratzlaff, WSO Heeren, POWs);
 01 October 1972, an F-4 Phantom (US does not confirm).

See also
List of Vietnam War flying aces
Weapons of the Vietnam War

References

Bibliography 

North Vietnamese military personnel of the Vietnam War
Living people
North Vietnamese Vietnam War flying aces
1944 births
Members of the 7th Central Committee of the Communist Party of Vietnam